Two ships of the Royal Navy have borne the name HMS Adam & Eve:

 was a 20-gun store ship captured from the Dutch in 1652 and sold in 1657.
 was a 6-gun hoy captured from the Dutch in 1665 and sunk as a foundation in 1673.

References

Royal Navy ship names